Raratoka Island (also known as Centre Island) is a small island  in Foveaux Strait off the coast of Stewart Island / Rakiura, New Zealand. Several small reefs surround the island, notably Escape Reefs,  to the east, and Hapuka Rock,  to the southwest.

The island was named by Māori after the Island of Rarotonga, and is the Southern Māori form of the same word, meaning "beneath the south" or "south wind".

Raratoka Island is used as an island sanctuary, with the Department of Conservation releasing 15 captive bred birds in 2006 after eradicating the population of Polynesian rats. The island contains a lighthouse and a small airstrip.

References

Islands of Southland, New Zealand
Foveaux Strait